The Pea is the popular name of the traditional male tatau (tattoo) of Samoa, also known as the . It covers the body from the middle of the back to the knees, and consists of heavy black lines, arrows, and dots.

History
The tattoo was originally made of bone or sharpened boar husk into a comb style with serrated teeth shaped like needles. It was then attached to a small patch of sea turtle which was connected to a wooden handle.

In the 1830s, English missionaries attempted to abolish the pe'a by banning it in missionary schools. The purpose of this was to “westernise” the Samoans, but during the time that tattooing was banned, it was still done in secret. Because of this, Samoa is the only Polynesian country that has managed to retain its traditional tattoos in modern times, although it is done to a much lesser extent than it used to be.

In present times, the traditional design of Pe'a continues to be a source of sacred cultural heritage, as an act of honour.

Description
The Pe'a covers the body from the middle of the back to the knees. The word tattoo in the English language is believed to have originated from the Samoan word "".

The  are revered masters in Samoan society. In Samoan custom, a Pe'a is only done the traditional way, with aspects of cultural ceremony and ritual, and has a strong meaning for the one who receives it. The  works with two assistants, called , who are often apprentice tattooists and they stretch the skin, wipe the excess ink and blood and generally support the tattooist in their work. The process takes place with the subject lying on mats on the floor with the tattooist and assistants beside them. Family members of the person getting the tattoo are often in attendance at a respectful distance to provide words of encouragement, sometimes through song. The Pe'a can take less than a week to complete, or, in some cases, years.

The ink colour is black. The tattoo starts on the back and finishes on the navel. Overall, the design is symmetrical with a pattern consisting mainly of straight lines and larger blocks of dark cover, usually around the thighs. Some art experts have made a comparison between the distinctive Samoan tattoo patterns to other artforms including designs on tapa cloth and Lapita pottery.

Traditional Samoan tattooing of the Pe'a, body tattoo, is an ordeal that is not lightly undergone. It can take many weeks to complete, is very painful and used to be a necessary prerequisite to receiving a  title; this however is no longer the case. Tattooing was also a very costly procedure, the tattooer receiving in the region of 700 fine mats as payment. It was not uncommon for half a dozen boys to be tattooed at the same time, requiring the services of four or more tattooers. It was not just the men who received tattoos, but the women too, although their designs are of a much lighter nature, resembling a filigree rather than having the large areas of solid dye which are frequently seen in men's tattoos. Nor was the tattooing of women as ritualised as that of the men.

Lama
The modern  artists utilize commercially produced inks that comply with international tattoo regulations and local health safety codes.

Societal significance
Samoan males with a Pe'a are called  and are respected for their courage. Those who begin the tattooing ordeal but do not complete it due to the pain, or more rarely the inability to adequately pay the tattooist, are called , a mark of shame. The traditional female tattoo in Samoa is the Malu. In Samoan society, the Pe'a and the Malu are viewed with cultural pride and identity as well as a hallmark of manhood and womanhood.

' is an ancient Polynesian art form which is associated with the rites of passage for men. Pe'a is also the Samoan word for the flying fox (fruit bat, Pteropus samoensis), and there are many Polynesian myths, proverbs and legends associated with this winged creature. One legend from the island of Savai'i is about Nafanua, Samoa's goddess of war, rescued by flying foxes when she was stranded on an inhospitable island.

Origins
In Polynesia, the origins of tattoo is varied.

As they swam they sang a song which said only women get tattooed. But as they neared the village of Falealupo on the island of Savai'i, they saw a clam underwater and dived down to get it. When they emerged, their song had changed, the lyrics now saying that only men get the tattoo and not women.

The word  has many meanings in Samoa.  means to strike, and in the case of tattooing, the tap tap sound of the tattooist's wooden tools.  means to reach an end, a conclusion, as well as war or battle.  also means rightness or balance. It also means to wring moisture from something, like wet cloth, or in the case of the pe'a process, the ink from the skin.  means to strike repeatedly or perform a rhythm. For example,  means 'play the ukulele.'

Implements
The tools of the  comprise a set of serrated bone combs, which were lashed to small tortoise shell fragments which were in turn lashed to a short wooden handle; a tapping mallet for driving the combs into the skin; coconut shell cups to mix and store the tattooing ink ("lama") made from burnt candlenut soot; and lengths of tapa cloth ("solo") used to wipe blood and clean tools. The tools are traditionally stored in a cylindrical wooden container called "tunuma" which are lined with tapa cloth and designed to hold the 'au vertically with the delicate combs facing the center of the cylinder to prevent damage. The "sausau" mallet was shaped from a length of hardwood approximately as long as the forearm and about the diameter of the thumb. Various sizes of "au" combs were painstakingly fashioned by filing sections of boar tusk with tiny abrasive files knapped from volcanic flint, chert, and/or basalt rock. The smallest combs, used to make dots ("tala"), are aptly called 'au fa'atala, or 'au mono. Single lines of varying widths were tapped with various sizes of 'au sogi, while the solid blocks of tattooing were accomplished with the 'au tapulu.

Tattooing Guild
The prestigious role of master tattooist has been maintained through hereditary titles within two Samoan clans, the Sa Su'a (matai) family from Savai'i and the Sa Tulou'ena  family of Upolu. In ancient times the masters were elevated to high social status, wealth, and legendary prestige due to their crucial roles in Samoan society. It is known that Samoan  also performed tattooing for Tongan and Fijia paramount chiefly families. The late Sua Sulu'ape Paulo II was a well-known master whose life and work features in the photography of New Zealander Mark Adams. His brother Su'a Sulu'ape Petelo, who lives and carries out Samoan tattooing at Faleasi'u village in Upolu, is one of the most respected master tattooists today.

The traditional art of tattoo in Samoa was suppressed with the arrival of English missionaries and Christianity in the 1830s. However, it was perpetuated throughout the colonial era and was continually practiced in its intact form into the modern age. This was not the case, however, in the other Polynesian islands, and the master tattooists of the Su'a Sulu'ape family have been instrumental in the revival of traditional tattooing in French Polynesia, Tonga, New Zealand, the Cook Islands, and Hawaii, where a new generation of Pacific tattooists have learned the Samoan techniques and protocols.

In popular culture
 An early documentation of the pe'a on film is seen in Moana (1926), directed by American Robert J. Flaherty and filmed in Safune on the island of Savai'i. The film shows the young hero Moana's friend receiving a pe'a.
 The pe'a is featured in the 2007 horror film The Tattooist.
 The Disney animated film Moana (2016) shows a young man receiving his first pe'a.
 In professional wrestling, many Samoan wrestlers prominently have pe'a tattoos such as Roman Reigns, The Rock, and the Usos.

Non-Samoans and the Pe'a
Tongan nobility of the Tu'i Kanokupolu dynasty established the practice of pe'a tattooing among Tongan aristocracy in the pre-contact era. There are stories of Tongan royalty, Tu'i Tonga Fatafehi Fakauakimanuka and King George Tupou I of the ritual under Samoan . European beachcombers and runaway sailors were the first non-Polynesians to receive the pe'a during the early 1800s; among the earliest non-Polynesians to receive the pe'a was an American named Mickey Knight, as well as a handful of Europeans and Americans who had jumped ship, were abandoned, or visited Samoa. During the colonial era when Samoa fell under German rule, several Europeans underwent the pe'a ritual, including Englishman Arthur Pink, Erich Schultz (the last German governor of Samoa), and a number of German colonial officials. It is also known that several women, such as Karina Persoons, received a malu from  Su'a Sulu'ape Petelo.

Lyrics Pese o le Tatau song
It is known that the last verse was written in modern times, as it does not match the orthography of the first verses. Oral tradition maintains that this song is derived from a pre-colonial chant.

Samoan language

English language

This is the known origin

Of the tattooing of the tatau in Samoa

A journey by two maidens

Who swam from Fiji across the open sea

They brought the tattooing kit

And recited their unchanging chant

That said women were to be tattooed

But men were not to be tattooed

Thus the reason why men are now tattooed

Is because of the confusion of the maidens' chant

Arriving at the coast of Falealupo

They spotted a giant clam

As the maidens dived

Their chant was reversed

To say that men were to be tattooed

And not women

Pity the youth now lying

While the tufuga starts

Alas he is crying loudly

As the tattooing tool cuts all over

Young fellow, young fellow, be brave

This is the sport of male heirs

Despite the enormous pain

Afterwards you will swell with pride

Of all the countries in the Pacific

Samoa is the most famous

The sogaimiti walking towards you

With his fa'aila glistening

Curved lines, motifs like ali

Like centipedes, combs like wild bananas

Like sigano and spearheads

The greatest in the whole world!

See also
 Body suit (tattoo)

References

Bibliography

External links
Tatauing the Post-Colonial Body paper by Albert Wendt, Originally published in Span 42-43 (April–October 1996): 15-29
Tatau song with guitar during female malu tattoo session, Youtube

Polynesian tattooing
Samoan culture
Samoan words and phrases
Tattoo designs